Kirill Gennadievich Prigoda (born 29 December 1995) is a Russian swimmer. He competed in the men's 100 metre breaststroke event at the 2016 Summer Olympics.

Personal life
Prigoda's father, Gennadiy Prigoda, was a four-time Olympic medalist in swimming, and his mother, Yelena Volkova, was world champion in 200 m breaststroke. Prigoda is alumni at the SPbPU in the chair of "Strategic Management".

References

External links
 

1995 births
Living people
Olympic swimmers of Russia
Swimmers from Saint Petersburg
Medalists at the FINA World Swimming Championships (25 m)
World Aquatics Championships medalists in swimming
Russian male breaststroke swimmers
Russian male freestyle swimmers
Russian male medley swimmers
European Aquatics Championships medalists in swimming
Universiade medalists in swimming
Universiade gold medalists for Russia
Universiade silver medalists for Russia
Medalists at the 2015 Summer Universiade
Medalists at the 2019 Summer Universiade
Swimmers at the 2016 Summer Olympics
Swimmers at the 2020 Summer Olympics